The 1969 McNeese State Cowboys football team represented McNeese State University as a member of the Gulf States Conference (GSC) during the 1969 NCAA College Division football season. Led by Jim Clark in his fourth and final season as head coach, the Cowboys compiled an overall record of 4–6 with a mark of 1–4 in conference play, placing fifth in the GSC. McNeese State played home games at Cowboy Stadium on Lake Charles, Louisiana.

Schedule

References

McNeese State
McNeese Cowboys football seasons
McNeese State Cowboys football